The Milan Triennial XIII was the Triennial in Milan on the theme of Leisure, sanctioned by the Bureau of International Expositions (BIE) on 12 November 1963 and held between 12 June 1964 and 27 September 1964.

Prizes
The grand prize was awarded to Antti and Vuokko Nurmesniemi for an exhibition display, and a gold medal to Ilmari Tapiovaara for cutlery, and Gae Aulenti first prize for her work on the Italian pavilion.

References 

1964 in Italy
Tourist attractions in Milan
World's fairs in Milan